Skydancer is the debut studio album by Swedish melodic death metal band Dark Tranquillity.  This release was the last recorded output to feature vocalist Anders Fridén, later of In Flames, who was fired and replaced by then rhythm guitarist, Mikael Stanne.   Incidentally, Mikael Stanne was the lead vocalist on the first In Flames studio album, Lunar Strain.

The album was re-released in 1999 by Century Media Records as Skydancer/Of Chaos and Eternal Night.  It was also remastered and reissued later in 2013 in celebration of the album's twentieth anniversary.

Style
Sundin described Skydancer as "unique" within the band's catalogue due to its "weirdness and eccentricity", which caused him to look back on the album as "more of an acquired taste rather than a breakthrough release." When asked how far the band has come since the release of this album, Niklas Sundin stated:

Sundin recalled "a real sense of excitement throughout the songwriting process, and it felt like we really were onto something new and original that we needed to capture on tape and let people listen to as soon as possible."

Recording, production, and remastering
Sundin, while noting that the band were well prepared, recalled that "studio recordings back then were always stressful. Our budget only allowed for ten studio days for recording and mixing, so there wasn't any time to fine-tune things, and we often had to use first takes even if they weren't perfect. There was a good idea of we wanted to accomplish, but we lacked the studio knowledge to communicate it to the engineers, who in turn were clueless about extreme metal, so there were lots of tension and misunderstandings."

Niklas Sundin observed that the album was not properly remastered at the time of the 2000 edition, and indicated that the twentieth anniversary edition would mark the first proper mastering of the album.  Describing the production as "the weak point" of Skydancer, and qualifying that "there are limits to what one can do without access to the separate instrument tracks," he expressed his opinion that "everything sounds much better now. The album is so old that there wasn't even any proper mastering done the first time around; all songs had a different output volume and are sonically very incoherent."

Critical reception

Skydancer has received generally positive reviews, although the album's marked departure from later material has been met with some critical barbs.  For instance, writing for Allmusic, Jared Anderson criticized the "generally fractured and unfocused" arrangements and "shifting tempos, rhythms, and time signatures" for "limit[ing] the album's appeal". Conversely, Sputnik Music praised the album for its "awesome song writing and flawless execution", which the critic suggested is the first melodic death metal album."

Reflecting upon Skydancer, a "retro review" by About.com described it as a "dark horse" in the band's catalogue, "even more so than the controversial Projector. Describing the album as "primitive" and featuring an "underwhelming" performance by Anders Fridén, the reviewer nonetheless praised the "sense of adventurism".

Track listing
All arrangements by Dark Tranquillity

Personnel

Dark Tranquillity
 Anders Fridén − lead vocals
 Niklas Sundin − lead guitar
 Mikael Stanne − rhythm guitar, backing vocals
 Martin Henriksson − bass, co-guitar outro on track 3
 Anders Jivarp − drums

Additional personnel
 Fredrik Johansson - rhythm guitar and music on Of Chaos and Eternal Night

Guests
 Anna-Kaisa Avehall - co-vocals on tracks 3 & 6
 Stefan Lindgren − co-vocals on tracks 4 & 7, engineering
 Dragan Tanascovic − engineering
 Kenneth Johansson − photos
 Niklas Sundin − artwork, lyrics

References 

1993 debut albums
Dark Tranquillity albums
Spinefarm Records albums